Alexander Eberlein (born 14 January 1988) is a German former professional footballer who played as a centre-back. He played in the 2. Bundesliga for TSV 1860 Munich.

Career
Eberlein played for TSV 1860 Munich, TSV 1860 Munich II, SV Sandhausen and SV Wacker Burghausen. He retired from playing in 2014.

References

External links
 

1988 births
Living people
Sportspeople from Fürth
German footballers
Footballers from Bavaria
Association football defenders
Germany youth international footballers
2. Bundesliga players
3. Liga players
TSV 1860 Munich II players
TSV 1860 Munich players
SV Sandhausen players
SV Wacker Burghausen players